Keith Hervey (3 November 1898 – 22 February 1973) was a British equestrian. He competed in four events at the 1924 Summer Olympics.

References

External links
 

1898 births
1973 deaths
British male equestrians
Olympic equestrians of Great Britain
Equestrians at the 1924 Summer Olympics
People from Fulham